Axeltree is a public art work by Russian-American artist Alexander Liberman located at the Lynden Sculpture Garden near Milwaukee, Wisconsin. The sculpture is an abstract form; it is installed on the lawn.

Description
The sculpture consists of two disks painted red-orange and attached by rods at their centers.

See also
Argo
Orbits
Ritual II

References

Culture of Milwaukee
1967 sculptures
Outdoor sculptures in Wisconsin
Steel sculptures in Wisconsin
Sculptures by Alexander Liberman